Tipico is an international provider of sports betting and casino games, headquartered in St. Julian's, Malta. Tipico holds, among other licenses, a German sports betting concession from the Darmstadt Regional Council as well as other gambling licenses from the Malta Gaming Authority. The company also has branches in Germany, Austria, Croatia, Gibraltar, Colombia and the US. More than 1,800 people work for Tipico Group, with more than 6,000 in the whole Franchise network. CEO of Tipico is Joachim Baca.

Company
Tipico Co. Ltd. and Tipico Casino Ltd. were founded in 2004 as international trading companies in the commercial register of the Malta Financial Services Authority. The company group employs more than 1,800 people from 57 different nations and more than 6,000 in the whole Franchise network. In addition to the online business, Tipico operates as franchise system in Germany and Austria more than 1,250 sports betting shops. They also have offices in the US, Croatia, and Gibraltar. Tipico is the market leader in Germany with a market share of over 50 percent and is the sixth largest betting provider in the world. Tipico is one of seven companies, which, according to the Schleswig-Holstein Ministry of the Interior, has been granted a license for sports betting on the first time. 

Since 2016 Tipico has a new majority shareholder with the financing company CVC Capital Partners. In the course of the sale, a new CEO was also appointed with the Austrian Joachim Baca. On the 9th of October 2020, Tipico was granted a German sports betting concession by the Darmstadt Regional Council as part of the very first concession grant.

Sponsorship
In Germany, Tipico was a sponsor of the football league club Hamburger SV. In addition, Tipico has a partnership with the Austrian Bundesliga. Starting from the 2015/16 season there is also a sponsoring partnership with FC Bayern Munich. Since January 2018, Tipico is official partner of the German Football League (DFL). Including the 2020/21 season, Tipico may use the symbols of the Bundesliga and 2. Bundesliga in their communication.

Brand ambassador
Oliver Kahn has been a spokesperson for Tipico since 2013 and has been advertising with the slogan "Your bet in safe hands" for the company. Since the start of the second half of the season 2019/20,the betting provider has advertised with the slogan Tipico - Das Original.

Player protection 
According to Tipico, security and player protection are part of the product promise. The provider focuses on the early identification of risky gaming behavior based on scientific models. Derived from this, targeted interventions allow Tipico to offer each customer the level of protection she or he needs to enjoy the respective offers safely. The betting provider has a full-time customer service team, customer protection team and cooperates with external partners from science and the aid and consulting sectors. These include the gambler clinic of the IAP TU Dresden, the Department of Addiction Research at the University of Lucerne, the Gambling Addiction Aid, the online advice center Gambling Therapy and the Glücksfall e.V. association. 

Tipico states that it supports the Early Warning System (EWS) of the International Federation of Association Football (FIFA) and informs associations and organisers whenever the company registers suspicious betting activities. In addition, the company cooperates with the integrity department of Sportradar, with Betgenius, with the International Olympics Committee and with the Tennis Integrity Unit of the International Tennis Federation.

Memberships
Tipico is a founding member of the German Sports Betting Association (DSWV). DSWV, established in autumn of 2014, based in Berlin, advocates the regulation of sports betting in Germany in a law-free manner and sees itself as a central point of contact for the general public, especially for politics, sport and the media.

At an international level, Tipico is active in the Austrian Play Fair Code, the Association for the Protection of Integrity in Sports. The PlayFair Code carries out prevention trainings in the two Austrian pro-divisions. Tipico is also a member of the Austrian Bookmaker Association (OBMV). The members of the OBMV work together to create a foundation on which bookmakers can operate in a secure legal and economic environment. The OBMV pursues no self-economic interests and is politically and confessionally neutral. In addition, Tipico holds a membership of the Malta Chamber of Commerce.

References

External links

Online gambling companies of Malta
Online gambling companies of Austria
Online gambling companies of Germany